Angel Meléndez & the 911 Mambo Orchestra  are a Salsa, Mambo and Latin Jazz band from Chicago. The group achieved national attention in 2005 when their debut album was nominated for a Grammy Award for Best Traditional Tropical Latin Album.

References

Latin jazz ensembles
American jazz ensembles from Illinois
Musical groups from Chicago